The Museum of Fiber Arts was a museum in Dali District, Taichung, Taiwan. The site became Taichung's Museum of Fiber Arts in 2016.

Architecture
 Alice in Wonderland
 Diagon Alley
 Happy Drawing Room
 International English Art Village
 Music World
 Puzzle Area
 Rainbow Bridge
 Reading Room

Activities
The museum offered special programs for children during summer vacations, such as clay creation, bead work, English and art village, corrugated paper doll making, chess and other recreational and educational programs.

See also
 List of museums in Taiwan

References

Museums with year of establishment missing
Art museums and galleries in Taiwan
Museums in Taichung